Natthapat Trinkajee (born 12 June 2000) is a Thai badminton player. He won the bronze medal at the 2016 World Junior Championships alongside Pakin Kuna-anuvit.

Achievements

BWF World Junior Championships 
Boys' doubles

BWF International Challenge/Series (1 title, 2 runners-up) 
Men's doubles

  BWF International Challenge tournament
  BWF International Series tournament
  BWF Future Series tournament

References

External links 
 

2000 births
Living people
Natthapat Trinkajee
Natthapat Trinkajee
Natthapat Trinkajee